Xorcist is the second album by rapper X-Raided. It was released on December 12, 1995 for Blackmarket Records. In an interview X-Raided stated that he made the album while on trial. The track "Collect Call" on the album has a recording of a collect call from X-Raided which identifies him as "an inmate in Sacramento County Jail".

Reception
In 2009, Fangoria named it as an iconic horrorcore album.

Track listing
"Open Tha Casket"- 0:59 
"I Ain't Dead Yet"- 5:24 
"Recognize" (feat. Babe Reg & Lunasicc) - 5:11 
"Body Count" (feat. Da Misses) - 3:48 
"Collect Call"- 0:18 
"Check Your Bitch"- 5:06 
"Blaze Up"- 0:21 
"Wanna Get High?" (feat. Lunasicc) - 5:47 
"Unxplainable"- 1:09 
"Deuce-5 To Life"- 4:39 
"Unfukwitable" (feat. Da Misses & Babe Reg) - 3:51 
"Liquor, Niggaz & Triggaz" (feat. Brotha Lynch Hung & Sicx) - 5:43
"Done Deal" (feat. Da Misses) - 4:39 
"Brainz"- 1:02 
"Wit a Mask On" (feat. Da Misses, Chopah, Killa Hoe & Lunasicc) - 6:27 
"Mo' Brainz"- 0:51

References

X-Raided albums
1995 albums
Horrorcore albums